Slim (Jawi: سليم; Chinese: 仕林) is a mukim in Muallim District, Perak, Malaysia. Variant names are Selim, Slim Village, Kampong Slim, and Slin.  (Selim is the standard name preferred by the U.S. Board on Geographic Names).

Geography
Slim spans over an area of 410 km2 with a population of 21,900 people.

Notable attractions
Orang Asli village
Sungai Bil waterfall
Villages surrounded Slim Village are Kampung Sungai Jurong, Kampung Sungai Gesa, Kg Masjid, Kg Lintah, Kg Sawa, Kg Piong, Kg Penderas, Kg Tamba, Taman Slim Jaya, Taman Slim Jaya 2, Taman Kampung Slim, Rumah Awam, Kampung Baru.

References

Muallim District
Mukims of Perak